The selective inverted sink or SIS is a device used by farmers to protect plants from frost, developed by Uruguayan Rafael Guarga in the late 1990s.

The sink is actually a large fan housed in a chimney-like structure, and works by defeating surface temperature inversion. Cold air is denser than warm air, and will pool at ground level during calm weather. This lowers the surface temperature, even if the ambient temperature is higher. Vents near the base of the chimney allow cold surface air to be pulled up through the chimney, creating a suction effect that draws warmer air down to surface level.

The SIS is more efficient than typical ground-heaters, and is widely used to combat frost.

References
To blow up or down? Inverted sink fans offer alternative form of frost protection  by Paul Franson
Device for the creation of containment barriers for cold air in atmospheric conditions corresponding to radiation frosts US Patent 7654035
Su mercado es el mundo 

Uruguayan inventions
Farming tools